Narasimha Raju or Narasimharaju is a Telugu film and television actor. He rose to the heights of stardom with his movies Needaleni Adadi (1974), Thoorpu Padamara (1976), Kanya-Kumari (1977), Idekkadi Nyayam (1977), and Jaganmohini (1978). He is considered the folk hero of the generation next to the likes of N. T. Rama Rao and Kanta Rao. He is also known by the moniker Andhra Kamal Haasan.

Raju made his debut as an actor in 1974 with the film Needa Leni Aadadi. It is also the debut film for actress Prabha. The film ran for a hundred days and was commercially successful. Raju started getting offers for roles from other directors.

The film Jaganmohini (1978), directed by B. Vittalacharya, in which Raju plays the main character became a blockbuster. Later, he acted in such films as Gandhrava Kanya, Mantradandam, Mohini Sapatham, all directed by Vittalacharya. He also worked with other directors as a folklore hero in films like Triloka Sundari (1980), directed by Singeetam Srinivasa Rao. Raju acted in about 100 films in two decades. He is now active in Tamil Television Serials.

Personal life 
Raju is married and has a son and a daughter. His daughter, Jagadamba, is working as HR personnel. His son is working as a Project Director in Bank of Montreal, Canada. Both of them are married, and Raju has grandchildren.

Filmography

Telugu

Needa Leni Aadadi (1974)
Ammayilu Jagratta (1975)
Moguda Pellama (1975)
Atyavaarillu (1976)
Thoorpu Padamara (1976)
Kanya-Kumari (1977)
Rambha Urvasi Menaka (1977)
Idekkadi Nyayam (1977)
Anukunnadi Sadhista (1978)
Jaganmohini (1978)
Prayanamlo Padanisalu (1978)
Antu Leni Vinta Katha (1979)
Kaliyuga Mahabharatam (1979)
Lakshmi Pooja (1979)  .... Ramraj
Punadhirallu (1979)
Gandharvya Kanya (1979) as Raj Kumar Pratap
Punnami Naagu (1980)
Mahashakti (1980)
Sri Vasavi Kanyaka Prameswari Mahatyam (1980)
Tirloka Sundari (1980)
Venkateswara Vrata Mahatyam (1980)
Amrutha Kalasam (1981)
Daari Tappina Manishi (1981)
Gola Nagamma (1981)
Simha Swapnam (1981)
Entaghatu Premayo (1982)
Maro Malupu (1982)
Jayasudha (1982)
Amara Jeevi (1983)
Idi Kaadu Muginpu (1983)
Navamohini (1984)
Sangeeta Samrat (1984)
Apanindalu Aadavallakena? (1985)
Danger Light (1985)
Jai Bhetala (1985)
Mayaml Mohini (1985)
Patala Nagu (1985)
Prachanda Bhairavi (1985)
Vishakanya (1985)
Magadheerudu (1986)
Mohini Shapatham (1986)
Pagabattina Panchali (1987)
Sindhooram (1997)
Ganesh (1998)
Bala Veerulu (1999)
Prema Katha (1999)
Brundavanamlo Gopika (2013)
Hara Go pika Sambho Sankara
Anukoni Prayanam (2022)

Tamil

Jaganmohini (2009)

Television series

References

External links 
 
 Listen to some of the film songs acted by Narasimha Raju at Chimata Music.com

1951 births
Living people
Telugu male actors
Tamil male television actors
Male actors in Telugu television
Indian male film actors
Male actors in Telugu cinema